The Nicolas Born Prize, awarded by the German state of Lower Saxony, is a literary prize given since 2000 in honour of the writer Nicolas Born. It is awarded to notable German-language writers from Germany, Austria and Switzerland. The main prize is currently 20,000 Euros, and since 2015 a further 10,000 Euro prize has been awarded to a debut author.

Winners since 2000 

 2000 , Debut prize, Henning Ahrens
 2001 Jan Philipp Reemtsma, Debut prize, Frank Schulz, Kirsten John
 2002 Walter Kempowski, Debut prize, Matthias Jendis
 2003 Peter Rühmkorf, Debut prize, Mariana Leky
 2004 Felicitas Hoppe, Debut prize, Franziska Gerstenberg
 2005 Klaus Modick, Debut prize, Jörg Gronius
 2006 , Debut prize, Paul Brodowsky
 2007 Hanns-Josef Ortheil, Debut prize, Rabea Edel
 2008 , Debut prize, Finn Ole Heinrich
 2009 , Debut prize, Thomas Klupp
 2010 , Debut prize, Leif Randt
 2011 Peter Waterhouse, Debut prize, Sabrina Janesch
 2012 , Debut prize, Jan Brandt
 2013 , Debut prize, Florian Kessler
 2015 Lukas Bärfuss, Debut prize, Daniela Krien
 2016 Ulrike Draesner, Debut prize, Joachim Meyerhoff
 2017 Franzobel, Debut prize, Julia Wolf
2018 Christoph Ransmayr, Debut prize, Lisa Kreißler
2020 Judith Schalansky, Debut prize, Thilo Krause
2022 Dorothee Elmiger, Debut prize, Yade Yasemin Önder

References

External links
 

German literary awards
Awards established in 1979